Brother of Sleep is a 1995 German film directed by Joseph Vilsmaier and based on the novel Schlafes Bruder by Austrian writer Robert Schneider. It was chosen as Germany's official submission to the 68th Academy Awards for Best Foreign Language Film, but did not manage to receive a nomination.

Cast
 as Elias
Dana Vávrová as Elsbeth
Ben Becker as Peter
Jochen Nickel as Köhler Michel
Jürgen Schornagel as Kurat Benzer
Paulus Manker as Lehrer Oskar
Michaela Rosen as Seffin
Peter Franke as Seff
Detlef Bothe as Lukas
Michael Mendl as Nulf

Reception
It was the fourth most popular German film of the year with a gross of 9.9 million Deutsche Mark ($6 million).

See also
List of submissions to the 68th Academy Awards for Best Foreign Language Film
List of German submissions for the Academy Award for Best Foreign Language Film

References

External links

Reviews at Rotten Tomatoes

1995 drama films
1995 films
German drama films
Films directed by Joseph Vilsmaier
Films based on Austrian novels
Films set in Austria
Films set in the 19th century
1990s German-language films
1990s German films